Pleasant L. "Corl" Zimmerman (September 23, 1901 – August 14, 1967) was an American football player.

He played college football at Mount Union and professional football in the National Football League (NFL) as a guard and tackle for the Dayton Triangles. He appeared in 13 NFL games, seven as a starter, during the 1927, 1928, and 1929 seasons.

In later years, Zimmerman owned and operated the Fernwood Nursery. He died in 1967 at age 65 in a fire that engulfed his home located behind his nursery.

References

1901 births
1967 deaths
Dayton Triangles players
Players of American football from Ohio